Doctor Hugh Allan Stevenson (October 2, 1870 – May 28, 1942) was a physician and politician in Ontario, Canada. He served as mayor of London in 1915 and from 1916 to 1917. Stevenson represented London in the Legislative Assembly of Ontario from 1919 to 1923 as a Labour member.

He was born in London and was educated there. Stevenson served two years on London city council. He also served two years on the public utilities commission and two years as a water commissioner. Stevenson also served as a major in the local militia.

Stevenson was elected to the Ontario assembly in 1919, defeating Adam Beck, who was running as an independent. He ran unsuccessfully for the London seat in the Canadian House of Commons in 1935. On May 28, 1942, Stevenson died at his home in London after a long illness, aged 71.

Stevenson Avenue in London was named in his honour.

Notes

References 

1870 births
1942 deaths
Mayors of London, Ontario
Physicians from Ontario
Labour MPPs in Ontario
Ontario municipal councillors